P. dentatus may refer to:

Paralichthys dentatus, the summer flounder, a flatfish species
Plagiodontes dentatus, an extinct land snail species
Polyptychus dentatus, a moth species